Deportivo Cali Femenino, commonly known as Deportivo Cali, is a professional women's football club based in Cali, Colombia. They are the women's football section of Deportivo Cali and currently play in the Colombian Women's Football League, the top level women's football league in Colombia.

History
Although Deportivo Cali declined to take part in the first Liga Femenina Profesional tournament in 2017 alleging that they lacked the financial resources to field both a men's and a women's team, the requirement issued by both CONMEBOL and DIMAYOR ahead of the 2019 season to field a women's team in order for the men's team to be allowed to compete in international competitions compelled Deportivo Cali to found their professional women's football section, as the men's side qualified for the 2019 Copa Sudamericana on sporting merit.

In June 2018, Deportivo Cali organized their first "Women's Football Festival", aiming to recruit any potential players. In this event, matches and competitions between the club's satellite teams as well as the club's already existent women's football academy were held. The Carlos Sarmiento Lora football school also contributed to the formation of the women's squad. The team's participation in the Colombian Women's Football League was confirmed on 23 May 2019, whilst the women's team was officially presented on 10 July and three days later played its first game in the professional league, defeating Atlético F.C. by a 3–1 score.

Deportivo Cali's maiden participation in the women's league in 2019 ended with the team placing third in its group, behind América de Cali and Cortuluá, which prevented them from advancing to the playoff stage. They made it to the knockout stages of the league for the first time in 2020, finishing as runners-up of their first stage group to América de Cali, but were defeated by Millonarios in the quarter-finals.

In 2021, Deportivo Cali Femenino won their first league championship with an unbeaten campaign. In the group stage, they topped a group with América de Cali, Atlético Nacional, Independiente Medellín, Atlético Bucaramanga, and Real Santander with six wins and four draws for a total of 22 points. After defeating La Equidad in the semi-finals by a 4–1 aggregate score, they faced the defending champions Santa Fe in the final, clinching their first piece of silverware by winning the first leg 4–1 in Bogotá and drawing the return leg 2–2 at the Estadio Deportivo Cali. This title allowed them to take part in the 2021 Copa Libertadores Femenina played in Paraguay, in which they had a perfect group stage with three wins in three games only to be defeated by Uruguayan side Nacional in the quarter-finals.

In the 2022 Liga Femenina season, Deportivo Cali advanced to the knockout stages after finishing third in the first stage, but were unable to round up a successful title defense as they ended up losing the final to América de Cali. Following the Liga Femenina season, Deportivo Cali took part in the friendly tournament Copa Ídolas along with América de Cali, Atlético Mineiro, and Olimpia, which they won after defeating Atlético Mineiro on penalties in the final. The runner-up finish in the league qualified Deportivo Cali for the 2022 Copa Libertadores Femenina, in which they started their campaign with a 2–1 win over defending champions Corinthians. Another narrow victory over Olimpia and a 10–1 thrashing of Always Ready in the remaining group stage matches allowed them to win their group and advance to the quarter-finals, where they defeated another former champion in Ferroviária. Eventually, they lost to Boca Juniors on penalties in the semi-finals after a 1–1 draw, and ended up in fourth place of the competition after losing to crosstown rivals América de Cali 5–0 in the third place playoff. Due to their strong performance in the Copa Libertadores, Deportivo Cali Femenino placed 13th in the IFFHS Women's Club World Ranking as of 31 October 2022 with 300 points, being the third best ranked South American side after Brazilian sides Palmeiras and Corinthians.

Current squad

Staff 

Technical director:
  Jhon Albert Ortiz	

Assistant coaches:
  Jhon Freddy Tierradentro
  Juan Sebastián Solís

Physician:
  Javier Mosquera

Fitness coaches:
  Mateo Villalobos
  Estefanía Jaramillo

Goalkeeper coach:
  Christian Rayo

Honours

Domestic
Liga Femenina Profesional:
Winners (1): 2021
Runners-up (1): 2022

Friendly tournaments
Copa Ídolas (1): 2022

References

Deportivo Cali
Women's football clubs in Colombia
Association football clubs established in 2019
2019 establishments in Colombia

External links
 Deportivo Cali official website
 Club profile at Dimayor